Giarnni Regini-Moran (born 2 August 1998) is a British artistic gymnast representing Great Britain and England internationally. He is the 2022 world champion on floor exercise (the second British world floor champion after Beth Tweddle and the first British male) and the fourth British world champion in the sport of artistic gymnastics (after Tweddle, Max Whitlock, and Joe Fraser).

A prodigious junior, Regini-Moran is the 2014 Youth Olympic all-around, floor and vault champion, the 2016 European Junior all-around and floor champion, and 2014 European Junior floor champion. As a senior, he won team gold at the 2022 European Championships and team bronze at the 2022 World Championships with Great Britain, and team gold at the 2022 Commonwealth Games with England.

Personal life 
Regini-Moran was born on 2 August 1998 in Great Yarmouth, Great Britain to Glenn Moran and Kerri Regini. His father is of Irish descent and his mother is of Italian descent. He studied at St John's Catholic School.

Regini-Moran began gymnastics at age three, then the family moved to the Europa Centre in Crayford where Giarnni trained with coach Pete Etherington. He began competitive gymnastics in 2004. His younger brother, Ricco, has competed in artistic gymnastics at the national junior level.

In 2014, Regini-Moran was named Young Sportsperson of the Year at the Great Britain Pride of Sport Awards.

Regini-Moran currently trains at Pegasus Gymnastics Club, coached by Ionut Trandaburu, who also coaches James Hall.

Career

2013 
In 2013, Regini-Moran's international breakthrough began at the competition in Brasilia, Brazil for the 2013 Gymnasiade, he won gold in floor exercise, bronze in parallel bars and with Team Britain winning the silver medal.

2014 
In 2014, Regini-Moran won the British Junior all-around title under 16 years. He was a member of the British Team (together with teammates Brinn Bevan, Joe Fraser, Gaius Thompson and Nile Wilson) that won the gold medal at the 2014 European Junior Championships; he qualified for the floor finals, winning the gold medal.

Regini-Moran was selected to represent Great Britain in men's gymnastics at the 2014 Summer Youth Olympics in Nanjing, China. He won the all-around gold medal ahead of Russia's Nikita Nagornyy and the USA's Alec Yoder. He qualified for four event finals and won two gold medals (vault, floor) and two bronze (parallel bars, high bar).

2016-2018 
On 25–29 May 2016, Regini-Moran competed at the 2016 European Junior Championships where Team Great Britain (together with Donell Osbourne, Joe Fraser, Jamie Lewis, Joshua Nathan) won gold ahead of Russia; he also won gold in the all-around ahead of Russia's Andrey Makolov. In the apparatus finals, Regini-Moran won gold in floor, silver in vault, parallel bars and finished 5th in rings.

In July 2016, Regini-Moran suffered a serious leg injury, damaging multiple knee ligaments and his hamstring and fracturing his tibia, which left him out of contention for the 2016 Summer Olympics. After six hours of reconstructive surgery and a 12-month recovery period, during which he "had to learn to walk again", he was sidelined again after fracturing his ankle on his return to training while attempting a vault. He eventually to competitive action in mid 2018.

2019-2020 
In May 2019, Regini-Moran competed at the European Games in Minsk, Belarus, with Brinn Bevan and Jake Jarman. He was second on floor exercise and sixth on vault.

In October 2019, he was selected for the British team for the World Championships in Stuttgart, Germany, alongside Dominick Cunningham, Joe Fraser, James Hall, and Max Whitlock. He contributed to Great Britain's fifth-place finish.

Regini-Moran was slated to compete at the 2020 Birmingham World Cup alongside Fraser, but the event was canceled due to the COVID-19 pandemic.

2021 
In April, Regini-Moran competed at the European Championships in Basel, Switzerland, where he placed third on vault.

In May, Regini-Moran was selected to compete for Great Britain at the 2020 Summer Olympics in Tokyo, Japan, alongside Fraser, Hall, Whitlock, and Jake Jarman (alternate). He helped the team take fourth place with a score of 255.76.

2022 
In July, Regini-Moran was part of the England team that won gold in the team competition at the 2022 Commonwealth Games in Birmingham, alongside Fraser, Hall, Jarman, and Courtney Tulloch. He also took home silver in the vault and parallel bars as well as bronze on floor.

In August, Regini-Moran, Fraser, Hall, Jarman, and Tulloch were the Great British team that won gold at the 2022 European Championships in Munich, Germany. Regini-Moran also qualified for three even finals (floor, vault, and parallel bars), winning the bronze medal on parallel bars and seventh on floor. He withdrew from vault and was replaced by Jarman, who went on to win the event.

Regini-Moran was selected to the British team for the 2022 World Championships in Liverpool, England, with Fraser, Hall, Jarman, Tulloch, and Adam Tobin (alternate). In a dramatic comeback, he helped Great Britain overcome a poor pommel horse rotation to win the team bronze medal. After qualifying for the floor exercise final in fourth place, Regini-Moran won the gold medal in front of the home crowd with a 14.533, defeating the world and Olympic individual all-around champion, Daiki Hashimoto of Japan, by a narrow score margin of only 0.033. This was a part of the British sweep of the floor exercise gold medals at those world championships, as fellow Briton Jessica Gadirova won the women's floor exercise gold the next day. Regini-Moran also qualified for the parallel bars final in eighth place and finished one better in seventh.

Competitive history

References

External links
 
 
 
 

1998 births
Living people
British male artistic gymnasts
Gymnasts at the 2014 Summer Youth Olympics
Gymnasts at the 2019 European Games
European Games medalists in gymnastics
European Games silver medalists for Great Britain
Youth Olympic gold medalists for Great Britain
Gymnasts at the 2020 Summer Olympics
Olympic gymnasts of Great Britain
Gymnasts at the 2022 Commonwealth Games
Commonwealth Games gold medallists for England
Commonwealth Games medallists in gymnastics
European champions in gymnastics
Medalists at the World Artistic Gymnastics Championships
World champion gymnasts
21st-century British people
Medallists at the 2022 Commonwealth Games